Akash Singh can refer to:
 Akash Singh (Actor born 1987), Indian actor
 Akash Singh (cricketer, born 1995), Indian cricketer
 Akash Singh (cricketer, born 2002), Indian cricketer